William, Count of Nassau-Siegen (13 August 1592 – 17 July 1642), official titles: Graf zu Nassau, Katzenelnbogen, Vianden und Diez, Herr zu Beilstein, was Count of Nassau-Siegen, a part of the County of Nassau from 1624 to 1642. A member of the House of Nassau-Siegen, a cadet branch of the Ottonian Line of the House of Nassau, he was a professional soldier who served in the armies of the Hanseatic League and the Republic of Venice, then with the Dutch States Army during the Eighty Years War. Promoted field marshal in 1633, he was successively governor of Emmerich, Heusden and Sluis.

Personal details
William was born in Dillenburg on 13 August 1592, the fifth son of Count John VII ‘the Middle’ of Nassau-Siegen and his first wife, Countess Magdalene of Waldeck-Wildungen. He studied in Heidelberg and then went – along with the later ‘Winter King’ Frederick of the Palatinate – to the court of Henri de La Tour d’Auvergne, the Duke of Bouillon, in Sedan. With Landgrave  William visited England.

Career
William began his military career in 1610 in his father’s army in the Upper Palatinate. In 1615 he was captain in the Army of the Hanseatic League to end the siege of Brunswick. In 1617 he joined his eldest brother John Ernest, who was a general for the Republic of Venice in the Uskok War.

After the end of the Twelve Years’ Truce in 1621, William recruited troops for the Dutch Republic in the County of Nassau and entered the Dutch States Army in that same year. He was appointed colonel of the infantry on 24 July 1622, but lived in Siegen until 1625. In 1625 he became governor of Emmerich, then of Heusden from 1626 to 1637. The States of Holland refused on 25 November 1626 to make an exception for William to the rule that no military charges could be accumulated, and the Gecommitteerde Raden of Holland decided on 12 December 1626 not to oppose a proposed increase in William’s salary in the States General but to allow it to fade away. At the baptism of his daughter Hollandine in March 1628, the States of Holland were prepared to sponsor, complete with a baptismal gift (which meant they were willing to spend money on an annuity for life). 

Accompanied by 24 companies of infantry and some cavalry, William was sent to the Bommelerwaard by Prince Frederick Henry of Orange to prevent an invasion by Hendrik Graaf van den Bergh, then commander of the Army of Flanders. In the year 1629, William’s salary was £ 400 per month.

In the winter of 1629–1630, William was sent with his troops east of the Rhine to Cleves, Mark, Jülich and Berg, but without providing sufficient funds. In January 1630, Hendrik van der Capellen, gecommiteerde ter velde (representative of the States General of the Dutch Republic at the Dutch State Army), complained in a letter to Prince Frederick Henry that if the Dutch garrisons of Duisburg and Essen did not receive one month’s pay immediately, ‘sy het alsoo ergh als de Keisersche maken sullen’  (‘they will make it as bad as the Imperial troops’) and cause the citizens to leave those cities. The prince argued in response that it were ‘vrembde maximen’ (‘strange maxims’) to worry about this, because after all ‘die Landen den Vurst van Nieuburch toebehoorende waeren, ende dat het Volck alleene gesonden was om desen winter aldaer geïnquartiert te worden’ (‘the lands belonged to the Prince of Neuburg, and the troops had only been sent to be quartered there this winter’). In Soest Walraven van Gendt also complained but the presence of these soldiers forced the Spanish troops to withdraw from Unna, Hamm and Lippstadt, leaving them to the Dutch. In fact, William’s troops returned in 1630 after some unrest over their overdue pay, albeit in a rather desolate state.

In 1631 William purchased the heerlijkheid of Poederoijen on the River Meuse. In 1632 William was appointed ritmeester of the cuirassiers and in April 1633 succeeded his uncle Count Ernest Casimir of Nassau-Diez as Field marshal.

In 1636, the strongly defended Schenkenschanz was captured from the Spanish by William and his brother John Maurice. In 1637, William became governor of Sluis and took part in the Siege of Breda; being paid £ 7000 for his service. In support of his planned attack on Antwerp, in 1638 Prince Frederick Henry entrusted William with an important undertaking, the occupation of the levee at Calloo. Having taken the sconces of Stabroek and Calloo and chased off their Spanish defenders, William stopped and awaited reinforcements instead of continuing his march. Receiving false intelligence that a larger Spanish force was approaching, he hastily retreated but was caught and defeated at the Battle of Kallo on 17 June. He lost over 2,000 men, including his son Maurice Frederick, which meant Frederick Henry’s entire enterprise failed.

Count of Nassau-Siegen

Settlement of the succession by Count John VII ‘the Middle’

Because the county of Nassau-Siegen was so small (it had about 9,000 inhabitants and yielded an annual revenue of about 13,000 guilders) William’s father John VII ‘the Middle’ decided that the county should not be divided again. He made a will and testament in 1607, which stated that only the eldest son would rule and the other children should be compensated with money or offices. As one of the most convinced advocates of Protestantism, it was particularly painful for John that his second son, John ‘the Younger’, converted to the Catholic Church in 1613. In a codicil of 8 October 1613 he explicitly stipulated that his heirs had to keep the land in the Reformed confession. At first, the conversion of John ‘the Younger’ did not change this house law established by the will, because John Ernest was the eldest son.

To the surprise of his relatives, John ‘the Younger’ joined the Spaniards in 1617, the opponents of the House of Nassau and the Dutch Republic. In the same year, his older brother John Ernest died in the service of the Republic of Venice. John ‘the Middle’ had to decide whether an enemy of Nassau and the Netherlands could remain his heir. On 15 November 1617, John declared his will of 8 April 1607 to be null and void. Abolition of the primogeniture would have meant a division of the small country and John opposed all proposals in that direction. In an amicable agreement, he had his son sign a declaration on 31 December 1617, in which the latter declared that, although he remained a Catholic, he would not force his subjects to any other than the existing religious confession. On 22 December 1618 John drew up a second will, which promulgated the promises of his son as a condition and still held on to the primogeniture. He imposed the penalty of disinheritance on the introduction of ‘papism’.

Why John ‘the Middle’ still distrusted his son, in spite of the latter’s confirmations, cannot be fully elucidated. Maybe it was because John ‘the Younger’ loudly proclaimed that no power in the world could prevent him from succeeding in Nassau-Siegen, because the power of the Emperor and the King of Spain was behind him. Perhaps John ‘the Middle’ also knew the influence of the de Ligne family and the Catholic clergy on his son. It is certain that such rumours were conveyed to him from all sides and that his relatives and other Protestant estates of the realm warned him again and again about his son. Only when John ‘the Middle’ was convinced that his son was under the influence of the Jesuits and that the possibility of a Catholic area within the Nassau lands was a danger to the Protestant inhabitants, was he persuaded to make a new will. On 3 July 1621 John ‘the Middle’ drew up a third will, in which he laid down that the small county of Nassau-Siegen, which was barely able to support one lord, was to be split into three parts. His three eldest sons, John ‘the Younger’, William and John Maurice, were to receive one third each. The administration of the city of Siegen would remain in joint ownership.

For John ‘the Younger’, only one third of the county was provided for in the third will. On 6 August 1621, he was informed of this, with a statement of the reasons that had led his father to take this step. On 9 May 1623, i.e. not until two years later, John ‘the Younger’ protested against this with a letter from Frankfurt to the councillors of Siegen. He had not been idle and had not hesitated to denounce his father to the Emperor. He had to revoke it and answer to an imperial court within two months. It seems that John ‘the Younger’ then shrank from having the imperial decree delivered to his seriously ill father. None of the three sons mentioned in the will were present at the death of their father. On 13 October William and John Maurice arrived in Siegen, and on 26 October John ‘the Younger’.

Succession dispute
Everyone knew that there would be a dispute at the reading of the will on 11 December 1623. John ‘the Younger’ had the imperial decree read out and when his brothers demurred, he said as he stood up ‘’ (‘The Emperor will part us!’). He had taken the precaution of obtaining a further imperial decree on 20 November 1623 against Countess Dowager Margaret and her sons, in which the Emperor strictly forbade impeding John’s assumption of government, his taking possession of the land and his inauguration. On 12 January 1624, John ‘the Younger’ was able to accept the homage from the town of Siegen but only because he had secretly let a squadron of selected horsemen into the town through the castle gate (that is, not through a city gate) in a heavy snowstorm, so that they could not be seen or heard by the town guards.

John ‘the Younger’ received the entire inheritance, and the provisions of the will made in favour of William and John Maurice remained a dead letter. With the exception of John Maurice and George Frederick, the younger brothers accepted only modest appanages. Henceforth, until 1645, the county of Nassau-Siegen had two governments, one in Siegen, the other in Hilchenbach. For a short period (1632–1635) this situation underwent a temporary change, during the Thirty Years’ War, his brothers, who were fighting on the Protestant side, rebelled against John ‘the Younger’.

Count Louis Henry of Nassau-Dillenburg entered the service of King Gustavus II Adolphus of Sweden on 1 December 1631, who had landed in Germany on 24 June 1630 to intervene in favour of the Protestants in the Thirty Years’ War. Countess Dowager Margaret, through the mediation of Louis Henry, turned to Gustavus Adolphus and asked for help against the machinations of her stepson John ‘the Younger’. On 14 February 1632 the Swedish king sent an order from Frankfurt to Louis Henry to provide military support for his first cousin John Maurice. Louis Henry then occupied the city of Siegen with his regiment of Dutch and Swedish soldiers. One day later, on 29 February, John Maurice and his brother Henry arrived in Siegen. Just as John ‘the Younger’ had kept his cavalry in reserve eight years earlier, now John Maurice and Henry, supported by the presence of the Swedish regiment, negotiated with the citizens, who felt bound by the oath they had sworn to John ‘the Younger’.

On 4 March, after long and difficult negotiations, the citizens paid homage to John Maurice and Henry. John Maurice obtained for himself not only the Freudenberg district, which his father had intended for him in the will of 1621, but also Netphen, which had been intended for John ‘the Younger’ in the same will. William was confirmed in the possession of Hilchenbach and received Ferndorf and Krombach, as stipulated in his father’s will. The city of Siegen paid homage only to William and John Maurice, who only in 1635 re-admitted their elder brother John ‘the Younger’ into co-sovereignty. The latter soon restored the old order: in 1636, he again became the sole owner of his father’s property, with the exception of Hilchenbach, which he left to William and he again governed the city of Siegen alone. John Maurice was again excluded from the county’s sovereignty.

Death, burial and succession
William died at Orsoy on 7/17 July 1642 and was buried at Heusden on 24 July 1642. He left his part of the county of Nassau-Siegen to his half-brother John Maurice. As field marshal of the Dutch States Army, he was succeeded by his brother-in-law .

Marriage and issue
William married at Siegen Castle on 17 January 1619 to Countess Christiane of Erbach (5 June 1596 – Culemborg, 6 July 1646), daughter of Count George III of Erbach and Countess Mary of Barby and Mühlingen. From this marriage the following children were born:
 John William (Siegen Castle, 28 October 1619 – Siegen Castle, 25 August 1623Jul.).
 Maurice Frederick (Siegen Castle, 19 January 1621 – Calloo, 17 June 1638), was a captain in the Dutch States Army, was killed in the Battle of Calloo.
 Mary Magdalene (Siegen Castle, 21 October 1622 – Spa, 20/30 August 1647), married in Culemborg on 25 August 1639 to Count Philip Theodore of Waldeck-Eisenberg (2 November 1614 – Korbach, 7 December 1645).
 Ernestine Juliane (Siegen, 17/27 July 1624 – Heusden, 9 July 1634).
 Elisabeth Charlotte (Emmerich, 11 March 1626 – Culemborg, 16 November 1694Jul.), married in Culemborg on 29 November/9 December 1643 to Fürst George Frederick of Waldeck-Eisenberg (Arolsen, 31 January 1620Jul. – Arolsen, 9 November 1692Jul.).
 Hollandine (Heusden, 2 March 1628 – Heusden, 14 October 1629).
 Wilhelmine Christine (1629 – Hildburghausen, 22 January 1700), married at Arolsen Castle on 26 January 1660 to Count Josias II of Waldeck-Wildungen (Wildungen, 31 July 1636 – Kandia, 8 August 1669).

One of the daughters from this marriage was engaged to Count Crato of Nassau-Saarbrücken.

Known descendants
William has several known descendants. Among them are:
 the German Emperors Wilhelm I, Frederick III and Wilhelm II,
 the monarchs George IV, William IV, Victoria, Edward VII, George V, Edward VIII, George VI, Elizabeth II and Charles III of the United Kingdom,
 the kings Leopold I, Leopold II, Albert I, Leopold III, Baudouin I, Albert II and Philippe I of the Belgians.
 the tsars Ferdinand I, Boris III and Simeon II of Bulgaria.
 the kings Ferdinand II, Pedro V, Luís I, Carlos I and Manuel II of Portugal,
 the grand dukes Adolph I, William IV, Marie-Adélaïde, Charlotte, Jean I and Henri I of Luxembourg,
 the Romanian writer Carmen Sylva.

Ancestors

Notes

References

Sources
 
 
 
 
  (1911). "Willem, Wilhelm". In:  en  (redactie), Nieuw Nederlandsch Biografisch Woordenboek (in Dutch). Vol. Eerste deel. Leiden: A.W. Sijthoff. p. 1572.
 
 
 
 
 
 
 
 
 
 ;  (1999). "Johan Wolfert van Brederode 1599–1655 – ʻIn Opbloey neergetoghenʼ". In:  e.a. (red.), Johan Wolfert van Brederode 1599–1655. Een Hollands edelman tussen Nassau en Oranje (in Dutch). Vianen: Historische Vereniging Het Land van Brederode/Zutphen: Uitgeversmaatschappij Walburg Pers. p. 9–46. .
 
 
 
 
 
 
 
 
 
  (1979). "Genealogische gegevens". In:  (red.), Nassau en Oranje in de Nederlandse geschiedenis (in Dutch). Alphen aan den Rijn: A.W. Sijthoff. p. 40–44, 224–228. .
 
 
  (1882). Het vorstenhuis Oranje-Nassau. Van de vroegste tijden tot heden (in Dutch). Leiden: A.W. Sijthoff/Utrecht: J.L. Beijers.

External links

 Nassau. In: Medieval Lands. A prosopography of medieval European noble and royal families, compiled by Charles Cawley.
 Nassau Part 5. In: An Online Gotha, by Paul Theroff.
 Stadt Hilchenbach (in German). In: Kulturhandbuch für den Kreis Siegen-Wittgenstein (in German).

1592 births
1642 deaths
William, Count of Nassau-Siegen
Dutch military commanders
German Calvinist and Reformed Christians
German military officers
German people of the Eighty Years' War
William, Count of Nassau-Siegen
Military personnel of the Eighty Years' War
People from Dillenburg
16th-century German people
17th-century German people